David Romero Flores (born February 5, 1968) is a Mexican jockey in American Thoroughbred horse racing.
 
Flores was born in Tijuana, Mexico. His father was a jockey and an exercise rider in Southern California.

David Flores rode his first winner at Agua Caliente Racetrack in his native Mexico in 1984. He went on to win riding titles at Santa Anita Park, Del Mar Racetrack, Oak Tree Racing Association and Fairplex. His big break came in 1996 and 1997 when he rode Siphon to victories in big races. Among his notable victories were three Breeders' Cup wins aboard Tempera, Action This Day, and Singletary. Riding for Godolphin Stables, he won the UAE Derby in 2001 aboard Express Tour.

In May 2007, Flores earned his 3,000th career victory by winning the Lazaro Barrera Memorial Stakes at Hollywood Park Racetrack.

In December 2013, Flores moved his tack to Singapore. On March 25, 2015, Singapore racing authorities suspended Flores for one year for "failing to take all reasonable and permissible measures to obtain the best possible placing" in a race run the previous month.  This was effectively reversed by stewards in California on May 7, who ruled following a formal fitness hearing that Flores was permitted to hold a jockey license.

Year-end charts

References

American jockeys
American sportspeople of Mexican descent
Mexican jockeys
Sportspeople from Tijuana
1968 births
Living people
Mexican emigrants to the United States